Acrostigma may refer to:
"Acrostigma" O.F.Cook & Doyle, synonym of the palm genus Wettinia
"Acrostigma" Forel, 1902, synonym of the ant genus Stigmacros